Ben Howe (born 6 December 1974) is a former speedway rider from England.

Speedway career 
Howe reached the final of the British Speedway Championship on three occasions in 1994, 1995 and 1996. He rode in the top tier of British Speedway from 1991 to 2003, riding for various clubs. He was also the British Under 21 Champion and a World Under 21 finalist.

References 

Living people
1974 births
British speedway riders
Hull Vikings riders
Ipswich Witches riders
King's Lynn Stars riders
Poole Pirates riders
Newport Wasps riders